ESCM may refer to:

 ESCM (album), a 1997 album by BT
 eSourcing Capability Model, a framework developed to improve the relationship between IT services providers and their customers
 ESCM, the ICAO code of Ärna Airport